Buda Musique is a French record label specializing in world music. It was founded in 1987 by Gilles Fruchaux and Dominique Buscall. After Buscall died in 1990, Fruchaux became the sole owner. The label is especially known for its Éthiopiques series.

Buda Musique has released over 400 albums. Notable artists signed to the company include ethio-jazz figures as Aster Aweke, Mulatu Astatke, Mahmoud Ahmed, Alemayehu Eshete, saxophonist Getatchew Mekurya; klezmer musicians as Nano Peylet, Denis Cuniot, Yom; and world-music singers and bands like Les Yeux Noirs, Lo Còr de la Plana, Los Incas, Ray Lema, Cheikha Remitti, Cheb Hasni and Jean-Pierre Drouet among others.

References

External links
Buda Musique Home Page

French record labels
World music record labels